Smoky quartz is a brownish grey, translucent variety of quartz that ranges in clarity from almost complete transparency to an almost-opaque brownish-gray or black crystals. The color of smoky quartz is produced when natural radiation, emitted from the surrounding rock, activates color centers around aluminum impurities within the crystalline quartz.

Varieties

Morion is a very dark brown to black opaque variety. Morion is the German, Danish, Spanish and Polish synonym for smoky quartz. The name is from a misreading of mormorion in Pliny the Elder. 

Cairngorm is a variety of smoky quartz found in the Cairngorm Mountains of Scotland. It usually has a smoky yellow-brown colour, though some specimens are greyish-brown. The largest known cairngorm crystal is a  specimen kept at Braemar Castle.

Uses
Smoky quartz is common and was not historically important, but in recent times it has become a popular gemstone, especially for jewelry.

Sunglasses, in the form of flat panes of smoky quartz, were used in China in the 12th century.

Gallery

See also
List of minerals

References

 Holden, Edward (1925). "The Cause of Color in Smoky Quartz and Amethyst" in American Mineralologist, vol. 9, pp. 203–252

External links

Mineral Galleries - smoky quartz

Quartz gemstones